Wiesław Ziemianin (born 7 September 1970) is a Polish biathlete. He competed at the 1994, 1998, 2002 and the 2006 Winter Olympics.

References

External links
 

1970 births
Living people
Polish male biathletes
Olympic biathletes of Poland
Biathletes at the 1994 Winter Olympics
Biathletes at the 1998 Winter Olympics
Biathletes at the 2002 Winter Olympics
Biathletes at the 2006 Winter Olympics
People from Rabka-Zdrój